Poecilocharax callipterus is a species of fish named after its elongated dorsal fins and anal fins. P. callipterus is the first species of crenuchinae discovered after a gap of 57 years.. Poecilocharax rhizophilus was also discovered moments later.

Description 
Poecilocharax callipterus lives in the Apuí region of Brazil. The species is around 3 centimeters long and has a mixture of red long fins, and a black spot on its tail. P. callipterus has also been found with vibrant orange coloration.

References 

Crenuchidae
Fish described in 2022